Wicks is a Canadian talk show television series which aired on CBC Television from 1979 to 1981.

Premise
Cartoonist Ben Wicks hosted this talk show series. Some interviews were recorded on location.

Scheduling
This half-hour series was broadcast weekdays at 12:30 p.m. from 10 September to 16 November 1979, then from 7 January to 23 May 1980. Its second season was broadcast weekdays at 1:30 p.m. from 8 September 1980 to 30 January 1981. Repeats were broadcast from June to September 1981.

References

External links
 

CBC Television original programming
1979 Canadian television series debuts
1981 Canadian television series endings
1980s Canadian television talk shows